4/C, also known as 4th & Columbia, is a proposed supertall skyscraper in Seattle, Washington, United States. The project has been under development by Miami-based Crescent Heights since 2015 and undergone several design changes and modifications under three architecture firms. , 4/C is expected to have 1,090 residential units—apartments up to the 64th floor and condominiums from the 65th to 90th floor—along with several coworking and retail spaces. The latest version was designed by Skidmore, Owings & Merrill.

History

Crescent Heights bought the half-block property, which was home to two parking garages owned by the Costacos family, for $48.75 million in September 2015.

Concerns over the supertall skyscraper affecting traffic from nearby Boeing Field and Seattle–Tacoma International Airport prompted the Federal Aviation Administration (FAA) to review the project, similar to concerns shared with the nearby Columbia Center when it was built in the 1980s. The FAA was also concerned that the tower crane required for the skyscraper's construction would interfere with helicopter operations at nearby Harborview Medical Center, resulting in a temporary closure of the hospital's helipad.

The proposal was downsized from 101 to 100 stories in February 2016, reducing the number of residential units by 100 rooms and removing half of the proposed hotel rooms. Ahead of a design review meeting in early March, Crescent Heights scaled back its plans further, proposing a  skyscraper with only 93 stories to comply with the FAA's request. The adjusted height would make the building taller than the nearby Columbia Center and the U.S. Bank Tower in Los Angeles, but fall short of the Wilshire Grand Center in Los Angeles and the Salesforce Tower in San Francisco. Crescent Heights also submitted an alternative  proposal for design review, which would fall short of the Columbia Center.

The design proposal was inspired by the COVID-19 pandemic and the need for fresh air during self-isolation and quarantine, according to ODA. A revised plan submitted in October 2022 includes 1,018 residential units—of which 234 are condominiums on the upper floors—amenity spaces on the 62nd and 63rd floors, and coworking spaces. Skidmore, Owings & Merrill was listed as the architect for the project.

Design

, the revised design for the building is a 91-story supertall tower that stands  at the top of its mechanical penthouse. It would comprise  of interior space, primarily for 1,090 residential units that are divided between 856 apartments from the 3rd to 61st floors and condominiums from the 65th to 90th floors. Amenity spaces for the apartments and condominiums would be separated between the 62nd and 63rd floors, respectively; additional coworking and lounge areas are also planned for the ninth and tenth floors.

Several retail spaces are also planned on the north side of the building. The design also includes 873 parking spaces split between an underground garage and five floors aboveground that are served using a car elevator rather than traditional ramps. In earlier designs, the garage was proposed to be built for future conversion to housing and office space, using level floor plates and pre-built components for electrical and climate control equipment.

See also
List of tallest buildings in Seattle
List of tallest buildings in the United States

References

Proposed skyscrapers in the United States
Residential skyscrapers in Seattle